Angthong Football Club is a Thai professional football club based in Ang Thong Province. The club is currently playing in the Thai League 3 Western region.

Angthong were founded in 2010 and finished 13th out of 16 teams in their first season in the Central and Eastern League.

On Sunday, 15 September 2013, Angthong were crowned champions of the Central & Western division following a 3–2 win away at Huahin.

Stadium and locations

Records

Honours

Domestic leagues
Regional League Central-West Division
 Winners (1) : 2013

References

External links
 

 
Association football clubs established in 2010
Football clubs in Thailand
Ang Thong province
2010 establishments in Thailand